Konie  is a village in the administrative district of Gmina Pniewy, within Grójec County, Masovian Voivodeship, in east-central Poland.

The village has a population of 180.

References

Konie